The 5th Cavalry Corps was a corps of the Soviet Red Army. 

It was part of the 12th Army. It later became part of the 6th Army. It took part in the Soviet invasion of Poland in 1939 and the Great Patriotic War. During the Great Patriotic War, the corps distinguished itself in the Yelets Offensive, as a result of which, for courage shown in battle, in December 1941 it received the name of Guards and was transformed into the 3rd Guards Cavalry Corps. At the same time, the 3rd Cavalry Division of the corps became the 5th Guards Cavalry Division.

The 3rd Guards Cavalry Corps participated in the rest of the War as part of the Kalinin, Western, Bryansk, 1st and 2nd Baltic, South-West, South, Stalingrad, Don, 2nd and 3rd Belorussian fronts.

After the end of the war, the 5th Guards Cavalry Division and the 3rd Guards Cavalry Corps became part of the Northern Group of Forces at Lublin, but soon withdrew to Izyaslav in the Carpathian Military District. It was reduced to the 5th Guards Cavalry Regiment in May and June 1946 when the 3rd Guards Cavalry Corps was reduced to a division. The regiment and division were disbanded in April 1948.

Defeating the 2nd Army - Yelets Offensive 1941

Organization 
1939:
 9th Cavalry Division
 16th Cavalry Division
 23rd Independent Tank Brigade
1941:
 3rd Cavalry Division
 14th Cavalry Division

References

Sources
 

Cavalry corps of the Soviet Union
Military units and formations disestablished in 1941